The 1889 New South Wales colonial election was for 137 members representing 74 electoral districts. The election was conducted on the basis of a simple majority or first-past-the-post voting system. In this election there were 37 multi-member districts returning 100 members. In these multi-member districts each elector could vote for as many candidates as there were vacancies. 10 districts were uncontested. The average number of enrolled voters per seat was 1,955, ranging from Boorowa (1,142) to Canterbury (4,129).

Election results

Albury

Argyle

|  |  
	| colspan="2"   |  hold 2
	| colspan="3" style="text-align:center;" |  
|-

Balmain

|  |  
	| colspan="2"   |  hold 4
	| colspan="3" style="text-align:center;" |  
|-

Balranald

|  |  
	| rowspan="2" colspan="3" style="text-align:center;" | 
|-
|  | 
|-

Bathurst

The Bogan

|  | 
	| colspan="2"   |  win 1 and gain 1 from 
	| rowspan="2" colspan="3" style="text-align:center;" | (1 new seat)
|-
|  | 
	| colspan="2"   |  hold 1

Boorowa

Bourke

|  | 
	| colspan="3" style="text-align:center;" | (1 new seat)
|-

Thomas Waddell had been elected as a Free Trade member at the 1887 election however changed to the Protectionist party for this election.

Braidwood

Camden

|  |  
	| colspan="2"   |  hold 2
	| rowspan="2" colspan="3" style="text-align:center;" | (1 new seat)
|-
|  |  
	| colspan="2"   |  win 1
|-

Canterbury

|  |  
	| colspan="2"   |  hold 4
	| colspan="3" style="text-align:center;" |  
|-

Carcoar

|  |  
	| colspan="2"   |  hold 2
	| colspan="3" style="text-align:center;" |  
|-

The Clarence

Central Cumberland

|  |  
	| colspan="2"   |  hold 3 and win 1
	| colspan="3" style="text-align:center;" | (1 new seat)
|-

David Buchanan (Protectionist) won a seat in a by-election in May 1888 and unsuccessfully contested [[Results of the 1889 New South Wales colonial election#Balmain|Balmain]].

Durham

East Macquarie

|  |  
	| colspan="2"   |  hold 2
	| colspan="3" style="text-align:center;" |  
|-

East Maitland

East Sydney

|  |  
	| colspan="2"   |  hold 4
	| colspan="3" style="text-align:center;" |  
|-

[[Joseph Palmer Abbott|Joseph Abbott]] was nominated for both East Sydney and [[Results of the 1889 New South Wales colonial election#Wentworth|Wentworth]], however he was elected unopposed for Wentworth before the poll for East Sydney.

Eden

|  |  
	| colspan="2"   |  hold 2
	| colspan="3" style="text-align:center;" |  
|-

Forbes

|  |  
	| colspan="2"   |  hold 1
	| colspan="3" style="text-align:center;" |  
|-
|  |  
	| colspan="2"   |  hold 1
	| colspan="3" style="text-align:center;" |  
|-

The Glebe

|  |  
	| colspan="2"   |  hold 2
	| colspan="3" style="text-align:center;" |  
|-

Glen Innes

|  |  
	| colspan="2"   |  win 1 and gain 1 from 
	| colspan="3" style="text-align:center;" | (1 new seat)
|-

The sitting member George Matheson (Free Trade) did not contest the election.

Gloucester

Goulburn

Grafton

Grenfell

|  |  
	| colspan="2"   |  gain from 
	| colspan="3" style="text-align:center;" |  
|-

Gundagai

|  |  
	| colspan="2"   |  gain from 
	| colspan="3" style="text-align:center;" |  
|-

The sitting member Jack Want (Independent Free Trade) did not contest the election, having been elected for [[Results of the 1889 New South Wales colonial election#Paddington|Paddington]] on 2 February.

Gunnedah

|  |  
	| colspan="2"   |  gain from 
	| colspan="3" style="text-align:center;" |  
|-

Edwin Turner (Free Trade) won the seat at a by-election in 1888 and retained it at this election.

The Gwydir

Hartley

The Hastings and Manning

|  |  
	| colspan="2"   |  hold 2
	| colspan="3" style="text-align:center;" |  
|-

The Hawkesbury

The Hume

|  |  
	| colspan="2"   |  hold 2
	| colspan="3" style="text-align:center;" |  
|-

The Hunter

Illawarra

|  |  
	| colspan="2"   |  hold 1 and win 1
	| colspan="3" style="text-align:center;" | (1 new seat)
|-

Inverell

|  |  
	| colspan="2"   |  gain from 
	| colspan="3" style="text-align:center;" |  
|-

The sitting member Samuel Moore (Free Trade) did not contest the election.

Kiama

The Macleay

|  |  
	| colspan="2"   |  hold 1 and win 1
	| colspan="3" style="text-align:center;" | (1 new seat)
|-

Charles Jeanneret (Free Trade) was the sitting member for Carcoar.

Molong

Monaro

|  |  
	| colspan="2"   |  hold 1 and gain 1 from 
	| colspan="3" style="text-align:center;" |  
|-

One of the sitting members Thomas O'Mara (Independent Protectionist) unsuccessfully contested [[Results of the 1889 New South Wales colonial election#East Sydney|East Sydney]]. The other sitting member was Henry Dawson (Protectionist).

Morpeth

John Bowes (Protectionist) was the sitting member for Morpeth.

Mudgee

|  |  
	| colspan="2"   |  hold 2
	| rowspan="2" colspan="3" style="text-align:center;" |  
|-
|  |  
	| colspan="2"   |  hold 1
|-

Thomas Browne (Protectionist) was a sitting member for [[Results of the 1889 New South Wales colonial election#Wentworth|Wentworth]].

The Murray

|  |  
	| colspan="2"   |  hold 2
	| colspan="3" style="text-align:center;" |  
|-

The Murrumbidgee

|  |  
	| colspan="2"   |  hold 2
	| colspan="3" style="text-align:center;" |  
|-
|  |  
	| colspan="3" style="text-align:center;" |  
|-

The Namoi

The Nepean

New England

|  |  
	| colspan="2"   |  hold 1
	| colspan="3" style="text-align:center;" |  
|-
|  |  
	| colspan="2"   |  hold 1
	| colspan="3" style="text-align:center;" |  
|-

Newcastle

|  |  
	| colspan="2"   |  hold 1, win 1 and gain 1 from 
	| colspan="3" style="text-align:center;" | (1 new seat)
|-

Newtown

|  |  
	| colspan="2"   |  hold 3
	| colspan="3" style="text-align:center;" |  
|-

Northumberland

|  |  
	| colspan="2"   |  hold 2
	| colspan="3" style="text-align:center;" |  
|-
|  |  
	| colspan="3" style="text-align:center;" |  
|-

Orange

|  |  
	| colspan="2"   |  hold 1 and gain 1 from 
	| colspan="3" style="text-align:center;" |  
|-

Paddington

|  |  
	| colspan="2"   |  hold 3 and win 1
	| colspan="3" style="text-align:center;" | (1 new seat)
|-

William Allen (Protectionist) had won a seat at a by-election in 1888 however was unable to retain it at this election. John Neild had been elected as a Free Trade member in 1887 however changed to the Protectionist party for this election.

Parramatta

Patrick's Plains

Queanbeyan

Redfern

|  |  
	| colspan="2"   |  gain 2 from 
	| rowspan="2" colspan="3" style="text-align:center;" |  
|-
|  |  
	| colspan="2"   |  hold 2
|-

Peter Howe (Protectionist) won a seat at a by-election in 1888 and retained it at this election. William Schey had been elected as a Free Trade member in Redfern however changed to the Protectionist party for this election.

The Richmond

|  |  
	| colspan="2"   |  hold 2 and win 1
	| colspan="3" style="text-align:center;" | (1 new seat)
|-

Shoalhaven

South Sydney

|  |  
	| colspan="2"   |  hold 1 and gain 2 from 
	| rowspan="2" colspan="3" style="text-align:center;" |  
|-
|  |  
	| colspan="2"   |  hold 1
|-

St Leonards

|  |  
	| colspan="2"   |  hold 2 and win 1
	| colspan="3" style="text-align:center;" | (1 new seat)
|-

Sturt

Sturt and [[Results of the 1889 New South Wales colonial election#Wilcannia|Wilcannia]] were new seats split off from [[Results of the 1889 New South Wales colonial election#Wentworth|Wentworth]] which previously returned two members.

Tamworth

|  |  
	| colspan="2"   |  hold 2
	| colspan="3" style="text-align:center;" |  
|-

Tenterfield

Tumut

The Upper Hunter

|  |  
	| colspan="2"   |  hold 1 and gain 1 from 
	| colspan="3" style="text-align:center;" |  
|-

One of the sitting members John McElhone (Free Trade) did not contest the election. Robert Fitzgerald (Protectionist) was the other sitting member

Wellington

Wentworth

Wentworth previously returned two members, however it was split, with two new seats, [[Results of the 1889 New South Wales colonial election#Sturt|Sturt]] and [[Results of the 1889 New South Wales colonial election#Wilcannia|Wilcannia]]. One sitting member for Wentworth [[Joseph Palmer Abbott|Joseph Abbott]] (Protectionist) was nominated for both Wentworth and [[Results of the 1889 New South Wales colonial election#East Sydney|East Sydney]]. The other member for Wentworth was Thomas Browne (Protectionist) who unsuccessfully contested [[Results of the 1889 New South Wales colonial election#Mudgee|Mudgee]].

West Macquarie

|  |  
	| colspan="2"   |  gain from 
	| colspan="3" style="text-align:center;" |  
|-

West Maitland

West Sydney

|  |  
	| colspan="2"   |  hold 4
	| colspan="3" style="text-align:center;" |  
|-

Wilcannia

Wilcannia and [[Results of the 1889 New South Wales colonial election#Sturt|Sturt]] were new seats split off from [[Results of the 1889 New South Wales colonial election#Wentworth|Wentworth]] which previously returned two members.

Wollombi

Yass Plains

Young

|  | 
	| colspan="2"   |  win 1 and gain 1 from 
	| colspan="3" style="text-align:center;" |  
|-

See also 

 Candidates of the 1889 New South Wales colonial election
 Members of the New South Wales Legislative Assembly, 1889–1891

References 

1889